Syed Mansoor Ali Shah (born 28 November 1962) is a Pakistani jurist who is serving as judge of the Supreme Court, according to the seniority in composition of court he will become 31st Chief Justice of Pakistan from 5 August 2025 to 27 November  2027. 
He has formerly served as the 45th Chief Justice of the Lahore High Court.

Shah was born in Peshawar and educated at the Aitchison College, the University of the Punjab and Downing College, Cambridge. He joined private practice as a founding partner of Afridi, Shah & Minallah, and was involved in the Lawyers' Movement of 2007 seeking restoration of the judiciary. He was elevated as a judge of the Lahore High Court in 2009, and was appointed Chief Justice on 27 June 2016. He was elevated as a judge of the Supreme Court on Wednesday, 7 February 2018.

Since joining the court, Shah has authored decisions on constitutional law, human rights, and environmental sustainability and focused on judicial reform, including the revamping of the Punjab Judicial Academy and the creation of the LHC research centre. He is generally viewed as an independent-minded and reformist judge.

References

Living people
Pakistani judges
Chief Justices of the Lahore High Court
1962 births
Justices of the Supreme Court of Pakistan
University of the Punjab alumni
Alumni of Downing College, Cambridge
People from Peshawar
Aitchison College alumni